Pselnophorus brevispinus is a moth of the family Pterophoridae that is endemic to China.

References

Moths described in 2008
Oidaematophorini
Endemic fauna of China
Moths of Asia